The Tarnitz is a tributary of the Löcknitz in southwest Mecklenburg-Vorpommern and north Brandenburg in Germany.

From here the Tarnitz flows initially for about a kilometre in a southwestern and then southern direction, running east of the villages of Muchow and Zierzow. In the parish of Prislich meadows and larger woods frame its river banks, otherwise it runs almost entirely through arable fields from which many ditches drain into the Tarnitz. On the state border between Mecklenburg-Vorpommern and Brandenburg it is joined from the west by the Meynbach. From here on the Tarnitz in a southeasterly direction on Brandenburg territory, then forms a short section of the state border and discharges into the Löcknitz near Streesow.

The Mecklenburg-Vorpommern Advisory State Programme (Gutachtliche Landesprogramm Mecklenburg-Vorpommern) from 2003 describes the Tarnitz, which has been straighted along almost all its length, as not very natural (naturfern).

See also
 List of rivers of Brandenburg
 List of rivers of Mecklenburg-Vorpommern

References 

Rivers of Mecklenburg-Western Pomerania
Rivers of Brandenburg
Prignitz
Rivers of Germany